Jeanne Natoire (c. 1700 – 1776) was a French pastellist.

Biography
Born in Nîmes, Natoire was the sister of painter Charles-Joseph Natoire. She lived with him throughout her life; when he traveled to Rome in 1751 to become director of the French Academy in that city, she followed him there. She produced many copies of the work of other artists. 

Among these were eight copies of work by Jean François de Troy and Rosalba Carriera held in the collection of the Julienne family. Natoire's brother attempted to secure a pension for her in 1756. She is said to be the subject of a portrait drawing by Jean-Étienne Liotard currently in the collection of the Albertina.

References

1700s births
1776 deaths
French women painters
18th-century French painters
18th-century French women artists
Pastel artists
People from Nîmes